Milsko could refer to

Milsko, Lubusz Voivodeship in Poland, or
The historical name for Upper Lusatia